Willington is a village and civil parish in the South Derbyshire district of Derbyshire, England. The 2001 Census recorded a parish population of 2,604, increasing to 2,864 at the 2011 Census.

Geography

The village is at the crossroads of the north–south B5008 road (for Findern, Repton and Winshill), and the east–west A5132 road (formerly the B5009, linking Hilton and Swarkestone). The A5132 carried a lot of Nottingham – Stoke-on-Trent traffic before the A50 road was opened in September 1997.

History

Toponymy
The toponym Willington is derived from the Old English tun (homestead or farm) among the willows. In the Domesday Book, the village is called Willetune or Willentune, and the land was held by Ralph FitzHubert and was an agricultural village on the flood plain of the Trent. The village is recorded as Wilintun in about 1150 and as Wyliton in 1230.

Manors
Willington, in the hundred of Morleston and Litchurch, comprised two estates as recorded in the Domesday Book of 1086, one held by the king in demesne, the other by Ralph FitzHubert:

Royal manor
King Henry II (1154–1189) gave a manor in Willington to Burton Abbey. This estate was held in 1539 from Burton Abbey by George Finderne, Esquire. John Meynell, Esquire, died seised of it in 1561 and it was sold in 1760 by his descendant Hugo Meynell, Esq. to Sir Henry Harpur, 6th Baronet (1739–1789), the father of Sir Henry Crewe, 7th Baronet (1763–1819) who was the proprietor in 1817. No remains survive of the Meynell's manor house.

de Willington's manor
The other manor appears to have been held from FitzHubert by the de Willington family, which took its name from the manor. It appears to have given this manor together with the advowson of the church to Repton Abbey, to whom the tithes were appropriated in 1223. The de Willingtons were later seated at Yate and Sandhurst in Gloucestershire, and later at Umberleigh in Devon. In about 1554 William Westcote conveyed this manor to Sir John Port (d.1557), founder of Repton School and of the hospital at Etwall, and in 1817 it continued to form part of the estate belonging to those foundations, which also held the tithes and advowson of the vicarage.

Later history
In the 17th century Willington became the highest navigable port on the Trent. It first began to grow from a population of 477 with the construction of the Trent and Mersey Canal in 1777, the same year Bass beer in Burton was started, at which time it became a small inland port and a village with four public houses: the Railway (which was later demolished), the Rising Sun, the Green Man and the Green Dragon, all selling locally brewed beers from Burton upon Trent for the many Irish canal navvies.

The railway was built in 1838, the railway station being called Repton and Willington railway station and brought the scholars to nearby Repton School. The main-line station was closed in 1964 but a new station was opened in the 1990s as part of the (incomplete) Ivanhoe Line project to link Leicester and Burton-on-Trent and runs mainline trains to Derby, Birmingham and beyond. The village's population increased to 708 by 1940. Trentside Cottage, Bargate Lane is the oldest cottage in the village. A 200-year-old Cedar of Lebanon lies on the site of the now-demolished Potlock's Farm on Twyford Road in the village.  The bridge over the Trent was opened on 7 August 1839, being the only one between Swarkestone and Burton. To commemorate the centenary of the abolishing of the bridge toll in 1898, an annual raft race has been held since 1998 from nearby Newton Solney along the River Trent to Willington's bridge.

In 1995 Willington railway station was re-opened at a cost of £565,000 funded by the EU. Some scenes from the 2018 film "Get Gone" were filmed at Willington train station.

Economy
A former cheese factory in 1920 became a reclaimed aluminium processing plant in 1964 dominating the southern part of the village for twenty years and it was hoped that aluminium car engines would be made nearby for the Toyota Manufacturing UK (TMUK). The site is now closed and the land for sale.

Due to the opening of the nearby Toyota car factory (on the A38/A50) in 1992 between Willington (on the former Derby airfield at Burnaston) and Findern, the village has prospered and expanded since the 1980s.

Local shops include a post office and newsagent, florist, Co-op supermarket, delicatessen, wools and yarns, beautician, hairdresser, hardware and DIY, general store, pharmacy,Indian restaurant, chip shop, a Chinese take-away and the three pubs mentioned above.

Willington has an engineering firm, a large GP practice, a Church of England parish church and Baptist Chapel and the SOON Ministries literature charity, a large modern primary school and nearby in Etwall (within Willington's catchment area) an expanding secondary school, John Port Spencer Academy.

Willington Power Station

In the 1950s, two coal-fired power stations were built on a site off Twyford Road, between Willington and Findern. The stations were privatised and sold to National Power in the early 1990s and eventually closed in the mid-1990s. Although most of the stations were demolished at the turn of the millennium, the five cooling towers continue to dominate the skyline of the local area. The site was earmarked for a large residential development, but the application was rejected and in 2011 permission was granted for a new power station to be built on the site.

In the mid-1990s a pair of peregrine falcons nested in one of the site's huge cooling towers. Unlike many bird of prey breeding sites, this was widely publicised because of its impregnable location.

The power station was also the subject of a short documentary by Channel 4 titled "Drones in Forbidden Zones".

Bus company
Blue Bus Services (Tailby & George Ltd) operated a depot on Repton Road from 1922. The company was privately owned until December 1973 when it was sold to Derby Corporation. Tragically, two years later on 5 January 1976, almost the entire original Blue Buses fleet was destroyed by a fire at the depot. The Saxon Grove and Tailby Drive residential estate was built on the site in the late 1980s (Named after Percy Tailby, co-owner of the Blue Bus Service).

Notable residents
John Wetton (1949–2017), musician, member of King Crimson and founder of Asia.

Nature reserve
Although some of the former ARC owned aggregate quarry was back-filled with pulverised fuel ash transported via a pipeline from the power station, the remaining gravel pits at the southern edge of the village adjacent to the River Trent have now become a wetland nature reserve managed by the Derbyshire Wildlife Trust and developed with the aid of the Environment Agency.

Views of the nature reserve

See also
Listed buildings in Willington, Derbyshire

References

External links

 Pictures

Villages in Derbyshire
Civil parishes in Derbyshire
South Derbyshire District